Sugilite is a relatively rare pink to purple cyclosilicate mineral with the complex chemical formula KNa2(Fe, Mn, Al)2Li3Si12O30. Sugilite crystallizes in the hexagonal system with prismatic crystals. The crystals are rarely found and the form is usually massive. It has a Mohs hardness of 5.5–6.5 and a specific gravity of 2.75–2.80.  It is mostly translucent.
Sugilite was first described in 1944 by the Japanese petrologist Ken-ichi Sugi (1901–1948) for an occurrence on Iwagi Islet, Japan, where it is found in an aegirine syenite intrusive stock.  It is found in a similar environment at Mont Saint-Hilaire, Quebec, Canada.  In the Wessels mine in Northern Cape Province of South Africa, sugilite is mined from a strata-bound manganese deposit.  It is also reported from Liguria and Tuscany, Italy; New South Wales, Australia and Madhya Pradesh, India.

Sugilite is commonly pronounced with a soft "g", as in "ginger".  However, as with most minerals, its pronunciation is intended to be the same as the person it is named after; in this case, the Japanese name Sugi has a hard "g", as in "geese".

The mineral is also referred to as lavulite, luvulite, and royal azel by gem and mineral collectors.

See also

 List of minerals
 List of minerals named after people

References

Potassium minerals
Sodium minerals
Iron minerals
Manganese minerals
Aluminium minerals
Lithium minerals
Cyclosilicates
Gemstones
Hexagonal minerals
Minerals in space group 192
Minerals described in 1944